Carolina (minor planet designation: 235 Carolina) is a sizeable Main belt asteroid. It was discovered by Austrian astronomer Johann Palisa on 28 November 1883 in Vienna, and was named after Caroline Island, now part of Kiribati in the Pacific Ocean. The orbital plane is tilted at an angle of 9.0° to the plane of the ecliptic.

It is a stony S-type asteroid.

References

External links 
The Asteroid Orbital Elements Database
Minor Planet Discovery Circumstances
Asteroid Lightcurve Data File
 Lightcurve plot of 235 Carolina, Palmer Divide Observatory, B. D. Warner (2007)
 Asteroid Lightcurve Database (LCDB), query form (info )
 Dictionary of Minor Planet Names, Google books
 Asteroids and comets rotation curves, CdR – Observatoire de Genève, Raoul Behrend
 Discovery Circumstances: Numbered Minor Planets (1)-(5000) – Minor Planet Center
 
 

Background asteroids
Carolina
Carolina
S-type asteroids (Tholen)
18831128